Goodenia coerulea is a species of flowering plant in the family Goodeniaceae and is endemic to the south-west of Western Australia. It is an erect, perennial shrub or biennial herb shrub with linear leaves at the base of the plant, sometimes with a few teeth on the edges, racemes of blue flowers and oval fruit.

Description

Taxonomy and naming
Goodenia coerulea was first formally described in 1810 by Robert Brown in Prodromus Florae Novae Hollandiae et Insulae Van Diemen. The specific epithet (coerulea) means "deep sky-blue". (The epithet has sometimes been given as caerulea, but Brown's original spelling was coerulea.)

Distribution and habitat
This goodenia grows in a variety of habitats and is widely distributed from near Shark Bay the south coast in the south-west of Western Australia.

Conservation status
Goodenia coerulea is classified as "not threatened" by the Western Australian Government Department of Parks and Wildlife.

References

coerulea
Eudicots of Western Australia
Plants described in 1810
Taxa named by Robert Brown (botanist, born 1773)